Ashfield is a small village in the Test Valley district of Hampshire, England. It lies 1.6 miles (2.5 km) south-east from Romsey, its nearest town. It is in the civil parish of Romsey Extra.

Villages in Hampshire